Biver may refer to:

People 
 Bob Biver (born 1985), Luxembourgish alpine skier
 Jean-Claude Biver (born 1949), Luxembourgish businessman
 René Biver (1920–1983), Luxembourgish cyclist

Other uses 
 Biever House, a United States national historic site
 26969 Biver, a minor planet
 Biver Banca, an Italian savings bank

See also
 Biever, a surname